Catholics is a 1973 television play also known as Conflict, A Fable of the Future and The Visitor, which was directed by Jack Gold. 

Based on the novel of the same name by Brian Moore, who also wrote the screenplay for the film, it stars Trevor Howard, Martin Sheen and Cyril Cusack and was originally presented on the ITV Sunday Night Theatre.   

The film is rated 4.5 out 5 stars in DVD & Video Guide 2007.

Plot
Brian Moore's original novel was written in 1972. The film is set in the then futuristic year of 2000. 

In defiance of the Sacrosanctum Concilium from the edicts of the Second Vatican Council, and a future Fourth Vatican Council, a group of monks from a monastery located on an island offshore the Republic of Ireland conducts the traditional Tridentine Mass in Latin on the Irish mainland. These traditional masses are so popular that groups from all parts of the world make pilgrimages to attend the masses and express their displeasure at the changes in the Roman Catholic Church. This future Vatican Council also destroys the mystery of the Mass, denies Transubstantiation, and insists that priests only wear clerical clothing on ceremonial occasions.

The Vatican is outraged at the beginnings of a potential Counter-Reformation, particularly when an upcoming Interfaith dialogue is about to take place in Singapore. The Father General sends out Father Kinsella, a strong adherent of Liberation theology to order the monks to change their ways or face transfer to other monasteries.

Cast
 Martin Sheen as Father Kinsella
 Trevor Howard as	The Abbot
 Raf Vallone as Father General (role deleted in some prints)
 Cyril Cusack as Father Manus
 Andrew Keir as Father Matthew
 Godfrey Quigley as Father Walter
 Michael Gambon as Brother Kevin
 Leon Vitali as Brother Donald
 Cecil Sheridan as Brother Malachy
 	Tom Jordan as	Father Terrence
 Seamus Healy as Brother Pius
 John Kelly as Brother Paul
 John Franklyn as Brother Martin
 Patrick Long as Brother Sean
 Liam Burk as Brother Daniel 
 Richard Oliver as Brother Alphonsus

Production
The film was shot on Sherkin Island with many interiors shot in Cahir Castle.

References

External links
 
 

1973 British television episodes
1973 television plays
British television plays
ITV Sunday Night Theatre
Works about Catholicism
Works by Brian Moore (novelist)
Television shows produced by Harlech Television (HTV)